P&N Bank is a division of Police & Nurses Limited and an Australian owned bank managed in Western Australia. Operating under a mutual model, P&N Bank provides retail banking services such as savings, lending products and insurance services. With a branch network of 15 branches in Western Australia, P&N Bank also has a Perth based Contact centre, online banking facilities and is partnered with Cuscal, and is a provider of access to the New Payments Platform (NPP). As a mutual bank there are no third party shareholders; members who bank with P&N Bank and hold a share in Police & Nurses Limited are the owners of the Bank. P&N Bank is a member of COBA, the industry body that represents the credit unions, building societies and mutual banks in Australia and BCCM (Bureau of Credit Unions, Co-operatives and Mutuals). P&N Bank is one of the major sponsors of the Perth Wildcats.

History

Police & Nurses Credit Society originated in Western Australia in 1990 from the merger of the Police Credit Society of Western Australia Ltd  and Western Australia Nurses Credit Society Ltd. In 2001, the organisation merged with Energy Credit Union Ltd, which was the amalgamation of a number of smaller WA credit unions, the oldest of which was established in 1949. Around 15 credit unions make up P&N Bank’s history.

 1969 – Western Australian Police Union Cooperative Credit Union Society Limited established
 1972 – WA Nurses Credit Society Limited established
 1981 – MTT Salaried Officers Association Credit Union merged with the Police Credit Society and membership was extended to members of the Army, Navy and Air Force
 1990 – Merger of the Police Credit Society and the Nurses Credit Society to Police & Nurses Credit Society
 2001 – Energy Credit Union merged into Police & Nurses Credit Society
 2013 – Members vote to rebrand Police & Nurses Credit Union to P&N Bank* 
 2019 – bcu became a division of Police & Nurses Limited, establishing a national multi-brand organisation with P&N Bank operating in Western Australia and bcu operating in NSW and south eastern Queensland.

In March 2013, after obtaining regulator approval, Police & Nurses Credit Society became a mutual bank trading as P&N Bank.

Corporate governance

The P&N Bank Board of Directors is responsible for the Corporate Governance of P&N and its controlled entities. The Board manages the business in accordance with its policies, legislation, APRA prudential requirements and the Constitution of P&N. To ensure the Board can fulfil its responsibilities and comply with policies and ethical standards, a Code of Conduct and Board Charter are in place.

Awards and recognition

 2013 – P&N Bank took out the inaugural Pinnacle Award for Marketing Excellence  for their re-brand to a Bank.

See also

 Banking in Australia

References

Banks of Australia
Australian companies established in 2013
Banks established in 2013